Octacnemidae is a family of tunicates belonging to the order Phlebobranchia.

Genera:
 Benthascidia Ritter, 1907
 Cibacapsa Monniot & Monniot, 1983
 Cryptia Monniot & Monniot, 1985
 Dicopia Sluiter, 1905
 Kaikoja Monniot, 1998
 Megalodicopia Oka, 1918
 Myopegma Monniot & Monniot, 2003
 Octacnemus Moseley, 1877
 Polyoctacnemus Ihle, 1935
 Situla Vinogradova, 1969

References

Tunicates